David Meredith may refer to:
 David Meredith (photographer)
 David Meredith (minister)
 David Lloyd Meredith, English actor